The 1889 New York Athletic Club football team was an American football team that represented the New York Athletic Club in the American Football Union (AFU) during the 1889 college football season. The team played its home games at the Polo Grounds in Manhattan, compiled a 4–5 record (1–4 against AFU opponents), and shut out two opponents.  The New York team was not always able to employ elven men on the field, forced to place with ten, nine, or even eight men on account of shortages in available members throughout the season.

Schedule

References

New York Athletic Club
New York Athletic Club football seasons
New York Athletic Club football